Viola Lake is a small lake in Val Viola, Lombardy, Italy. It is located in the municipality of Valdidentro.

References

Lakes of Lombardy
Province of Sondrio